Raymond or Ray Carter may refer to:

 Raymond Carter (British politician) (1935–2020), British Labour Party politician
 Raymond Carter (Missouri politician), American politician
 Raymond Bonham Carter (1929–2004), British banker
 Raymond Carter (convict), convicted of murder but later released
 Raymond H. A. Carter (born 1955), Gendarmerie Nationale officer
 Ray Carter (footballer) (born 1951), English footballer
 Ray Carter (cricketer) (1933–2012),  English cricketer
 Ray Carter (basketball) (born 1972), British-American basketball player
Ray Carter, business writer associated with the 10 Cs model of supplier evaluation